The 2023 season will be Liam Cahill's first year as manager of the Tipperary senior hurling team, having been appointed on 18 July 2022 on a three year term.

On 13 July 2022, the Tipperary management committee had relieved Colm Bonnar from his duties as Tipperary senior hurling manager after one year in charge with Liam Cahill named as the new manager five days later.

The team were sponsored for the second year by financial services technology solutions company Fiserv.

On 15 November 2022, Noel McGrath was named as the new captain of the team with 2022 captain Ronan Maher as vice-captain.

2023 senior hurling management team
On 23 July 2022, Liam Cahill named former Tipperary captain Pádraic Maher as a selector with Toomevara's Michael Bevans as coach. Loughmore Castleiney's Declan Laffan and Clonoulty Rossmore's TJ Ryan were also named as selectors
On 15 November 2022, former Waterford player Tony Browne was also named as a selector after previously working with Cahill with Waterford.

2023 squad
On 14 November 2022, Liam Cahill announced his panel for pre-season and the upcoming National League, a total of 25 clubs were represented. 
Former All-Star goalkeeper Brian Hogan was not included as he is going travelling during the year. John O'Dwyer, who missed the 2022 campaign due to a knee injury was also omitted from the panel and announced his retirement from inter-county hurling on 16 February.
Niall O'Meara and Bryan O'Meara returned to the panel after travelling in 2022. Shane Neville, now playing for Cratloe in Clare, was the only player based outside the county to be included.
The team returned to training on 24 November.

 Cathal Barrett (Holycross Ballycahill)
 Conor Bowe (Moyne Templetuohy)
 Michael Breen (Ballina)
 Ger Browne (Cashel King Cormacs)
 Paddy Cadell (JK Brackens)
 Seamus Callanan (Drom & Inch)
 John Campion (Drom & Inch)
 Pauric Campion (Drom & Inch)
 Ciaran Connolly (Loughmore Castleiney)
 Eoghan Connolly (Loughmore Castleiney)
 Paddy Creedon (Thurles Sarsfields)
 Joe Fogarty (Moneygall)
 Jason Forde (Silvermines)
 Enda Heffernan (Clonoulty Rossmore)
 Barry Hogan (Kiladangan)
 Seamus Kennedy (St Mary's)
 Mark Kehoe (Kilsheelan Kilcash)
 Patrick Maher (Lorrha Dorrha)
 Ronan Maher (Thurles Sarsfields)
 Jake Morris (Nenagh Eire Og)
 Conor McCarthy (Nenagh Eire Og)
 Dan McCormack (Borris Ileigh)
 Brian McGrath (Loughmore Castleiney)
 John McGrath (Loughmore Castleiney)
 Noel McGrath (Loughmore Castleiney)
 Shane Neville (Cratloe, Clare)
 Andrew Ormond (JK Brackens)
 Gearoid O'Connor (Moyne Templetuohy)
 Cian O'Dwyer (Clonakenny)
 Kian O'Kelly (Kilruane MacDonaghs)
 Bryan O'Mara (Holycross Ballycahill)
 Niall O'Meara (Kilruane MacDonaghs)
 James Quigley (Kiladangan)
 Gavin Ryan (Upperchurch Drombane)
 Jack Ryan (Clonoulty Rossmore)
 Johnny Ryan (Arravale Rovers)
 Sean Ryan (Templederry Kenyons)
 Rhys Shelly (Moycarkey-Borris)
 Conor Stakelum (Thurles Sarsfields)
 Alan Tynan (Roscrea)

The following players made their competitive senior debut in 2023.

Johnny Ryan against Laois on 4 February.
Sean Ryan against Laois on 4 February.
Cian O'Dwyer against Laois on 4 February.
John Campion against Laois on 4 February.
Pauric Campion against Kilkenny on 12 February.
Alan Tynan against Kilkenny on 12 February.
Conor McCarthy against Dublin on 25 February.

2023 Munster Senior Hurling League

Summary
The Co-Op Superstores Munster Senior Hurling League began in early January.
Tipperary played Waterford in their first match of the year on 3 January, There were first starts for Rhys Shelly in goal, Gavin Ryan, Pauric Campion, Shane Neville, Alan Tynan, Joe Fogarty, and Paddy Creedon. They lost out on a 0-21 to 1-15 scoreline.
On the 8 January Liam Cahill secured his first win as Tipperary manager when they played Clare in their second match of the Munster Senior Hurling League, winning by 2-22 to 0-20.
It was a first win for Tipperary since their League victory against Antrim in March 2022.
Tipperary qualified for the final due to Clare defeating Waterford by 1-24 to 2-18 on 15 January.

The final against Cork was played on 21 January at Páirc Uí Rinn in front of 4,727. Tipperary had a lead of six with four minutes of regulation time remaining having previous had an eight point lead in the 52nd minute, but ended up losing by one point on a 1-19 to 3-14 scoreline after late Cork goals by Brian Hayes and Jack O’Connor. Seán Ryan got the only goal for Tipperay in the 25th minute with a low shot to the net from the left after a one-two with Conor Stakelum, they had a 1-9 to 1-6 lead at half-time. John McGrath returned for Tipperary from an achilles tendon rupture he suffered in April 2022 with his brother Brian McGrath named as the man of the match.

Results

2023 National Hurling League

Summary
The National hurling league began in early February. Tipperary played Laois in the opening round on 4 February in Semple Stadium. The match saw manager Liam Cahill come up against his Ballingarry clubmate Willie Maher who is the Laois manager. The team was announced on 2 February.
Liam Cahill named four league debutants in Johnny Ryan, Gearóid O’Connor, Cian O’Dwyer and Sean Ryan.
In dry conditions Tipperary playing in navy jerseys had a 1-17 to 0-7 lead at half-time after dominating the first half, the goal coming from the 12th minute with a low shot to the net from Seamus Kennedy after a pass from Patrick Maher.
Gearoid O'Connor got eight points in the first half and went on to get eleven points in total. Substitute Jake Morris got the second Tipperary goal near the end of the game with Tipperary going on to win by 20 points on a 2-32 to 0-18 score-line.
In total they had 14 different scorers from play during the game with 18 wides.

A week later on 12 February, Tipperary played Kilkenny in the second round of the league in Nowlan Park. The match was shown live on TG4. Just six players from the previous game against Laois started with Séamus Callanan returning to the team for his first game since 2021.
In dry conditions in front of a crowd of 10,458, Tipperary had a twelve point lead at half-time on a 2-13 to 0-7 scoreline.
The Tipperary goals coming from Jason Forde in the 27th minute with a powerful shot to the left of the net rom the left after a hand pass from Séamus Callanan.
A second goal arrived in the seven minutes of time added on in the first half, Jake Morris finishing the rebound low to the net after Conor Bowe's shot had been saved. Paddy Cadell and Cathal Barrett after colliding with his own player both went went off injured in the opening twelve minutes of the match.
In the second-half Kilkenny narrowed the lead to four points before Tipperary pulled away again to win by six points on 2-24 to 1-21 scoreline, it was there first win in Nowlan park in 15 years.
Jason Forde was named as the man of the match after scoring 1-15.
Paddy Cadell who had gone off injured suffered a pivot shift injury to his left knee and will miss the rest of the season. Cathal Barrett who also went off during the game will be out for at least 10 to 12 weeks with a shoulder injury.

In round three of the league on 25 February, Tipperary played an unbeaten Dublin team at Croke Park with a  Saturday evening start. It was Tipperary's first appearance at Croke Park since the 2019 All-Ireland final.
There was seven changes to the starting team from the previous game against Kilkenny with Conor McCarthy, Bryan O’Mara, Brian McGrath, Conor Stakelum, Gearoid O’Connor, Seamus Kennedy and Mark Kehoe all coming into the team.
In dry conditions Tipperary had a one point lead at half-time on a 0-14 to 0-13 scoreline.
In the 40th minute second-half substitute Conor Bowe got a goal for Tipperary with a finish to the net from 10 yards out after a pass from Mark Kehoe.
A second goal arrived in the 52nd minute from Jason Forde when he beat the Dublin goalkeeper to a long ball in and flicked to the net to put Tipperary into a six point lead. After that Tipperary eased to a five point win on a 2-23 to 0-24 score-line to maintain their 100% record with three wins out of three.

Results

2023 Munster Senior Hurling Championship
The Munster Senior Hurling Championship will begin in April.

Retirements
In February 2023, John O'Dwyer announced his retirement from inter-county hurling after ten years.

Dillon Quirke Foundation senior hurling tournament 
On 19 February Tipperary played Kilkenny in the Dillon Quirke Foundation senior hurling tournament at Semple Stadium. The Dillon Quirke Foundation was established by the Quirke family in memory of Dillon Quirke who died after collapsing during a club game in August 2022. Kilkenny won the game on a 4-20 to 0-25 scoreline in front of 4,628.

References

External links
Tipperary GAA Archives 2023
Tipperary GAA at Hogan Stand
Tipperary Player Profiles for 2023

Tipperary
Tipperary county hurling team seasons